Hanns Nägle (born 8 February 1902, date of death unknown) was a German bobsledder who competed in the late 1920s. He won a bronze medal in the five-man event at the 1928 Winter Olympics in St. Moritz. This was the first medal Germany had ever earned at the Winter Olympics.

References

 Bobsleigh five-man Olympic medalists for 1928
 DatabaseOlympics.com profile

1902 births
Bobsledders at the 1928 Winter Olympics
German male bobsledders
Olympic bobsledders of Germany
Olympic bronze medalists for Germany
Year of death missing
Olympic medalists in bobsleigh
Medalists at the 1928 Winter Olympics